The fourth series of Ex on the Beach Poland, a Polish television programme, began airing on 17 September 2018 on MTV. The show was announced in 21 August 2018. Cast member for this series include two Warsaw Shore stars Anna "Duża" Ryśnik and Bartek Barański. The series was filmed in Cyprus.

Cast 
The official list of cast members was released on 31 August and includes four single boys: Warsaw Shore cast member Bartek Barański, Bartek "Gimi" Gimiński, Kasjusz "Don Kasjo" Życiński and Maciej Rataj; as well as four single girls: Warsaw Shore cast member Anna "Duża" Ryśnik, Anastasiya Yandaltseva, Ewa Piekut and Ismena Stelmaszczyk. With the announcement of the line-up it was confirmed that Ex on the Beach Poland cast member and star of the first series, Dawid Ambro, would be making his return as an ex alongside star Ismena Stelmaszczyk.

Bold indicates original cast member; all other cast were brought into the series as an ex.

Duration of cast

Notes 
 Key:  = "Cast member" is featured in this episode.
 Key:  = "Cast member" arrives on the beach.
 Key:  = "Cast member" has an ex arrive on the beach.
 Key:  = "Cast member" does not feature in this episode.

Episodes

References 

2018 Polish television seasons
Poland (series 4)